Peter Tippett (6 October 1926 – 13 January 1990) was an  Australian rules footballer who played with South Melbourne in the Victorian Football League (VFL).

Notes

External links 

1926 births
1990 deaths
Australian rules footballers from Victoria (Australia)
Sydney Swans players